Zirconium perchlorate is a molecular substance containing zirconium and perchlorate groups with formula Zr(ClO4)4. Zr(ClO4)4 is a volatile crystalline product. It can be formed by reacting zirconium tetrachloride with dry perchloric acid at liquid nitrogen temperatures. Zr(ClO4)4 sublimes slowly in a vacuum at 70°C showing that the molecule is covalently bound rather than being ionic. The reaction also forms some zirconyl perchlorate (or zirconium oxyperchlorate) ZrO(ClO4)2 as even apparently pure perchloric acid is in equilibrium with dichlorine heptoxide, hydronium ions and perchlorate ions. This side product can be minimised by adding more dichlorine heptoxide or doing the reaction as cold as possible.

Properties
Zirconium perchlorate is very hydroscopic forming hydrates, and it is hydrolysed by water to yield zirconyl perchlorate, ZrO(ClO4)2.
Zirconium perchlorate reacts with vaseline, methyl nitrate or acetonitrile. Zirconium perchlorate is inert towards carbon tetrachloride, chloroform, and dimethylformamide.
Zirconium perchlorate reacts with benzene at 20°C, but at -10°C crystals of Zr(ClO4)4•C6H6 are deposited.
Zirconium perchlorate has solid state transition around 45°C, a melting point between 95.5 and 96.0°C and a decomposition point starting around 120°C. The zirconyl perchlorate formed in the heat decomposition, itself decomposes around 290°C to form zirconia, chlorine and oxygen.

In the gas phase the Zr(ClO4)4 molecule has a D4 symmetry with eightfold square antiprism oxygen coordination. Each perchorate group is bidentate. The chlorine atoms are in a tetrahedral arrangement around the central zirconium.

In the solid phase, Zr(ClO4)4 crystals are monoclinic with a=12.899, b=13.188, c=7.937 Å, β=107.91°. There are four molecules per unit cell.

Related substances
Double salts of zirconium perchlorate are called perchloratozirconates or hexaperchloratozirconates. Known salts include caesium perchloratozirconate (Cs2Zr(ClO4)6), and nitrile perchloratozirconate(sic) ((NO2)2Zr(ClO4)6). Other perchloratozirconates with varying numbers of perchlorate groups also include CsZr(ClO4)5, Cs3Zr(ClO4)7, and Cs4Zr(ClO4)8.

Zirconyl perchlorate (CAS: 15607-09-7) is another perchlorate of zirconium with the formula ZrO(ClO4)2. It is synthesized by reacting Zr(OH)4 with HClO4, then the colorless crystals are formed by slow evaporation.

References

Zirconium(IV) compounds
Perchlorates